Edward Hyde, 1st Earl of Clarendon  (18 February 16099 December 1674), was an English statesman, lawyer, diplomat and historian who served as chief advisor to Charles I during the First English Civil War, and Lord Chancellor to Charles II from 1660 to 1667.

Hyde largely avoided involvement in the political disputes of the 1630s until elected to the Long Parliament in November 1640. Like many moderates he felt attempts by Charles I to rule without Parliament had gone too far, but by 1642 felt Parliament's leaders were, in turn, seeking too much power. A devout believer in an Episcopalian Church of England, his opposition to Puritan attempts to reform it drove much of his policy over the next two decades. He joined Charles in York shortly before the First English Civil War began in August 1642, and initially served as his senior political advisor. However, as the war turned against the Royalists, his rejection of attempts to build alliances with Scots Covenanters or Irish Catholics led to a decline in his influence.

In 1644, the king's son, the future Charles II, was placed in command of the West Country, with Hyde and his close friend Sir Ralph Hopton as part of his Governing Council. When the Royalists surrendered in June 1646, Hyde went into exile with the younger Charles, who became king after his father's execution in January 1649. Hyde avoided participation in the Second or Third English Civil War, for both involved alliances with Scots and English Presbyterians; instead he served as a diplomat in Paris and Madrid. After The Restoration in 1660, Charles II appointed him Chancellor of the Exchequer, while Hyde's daughter Anne married the future James II, making him grandfather of two queens, Mary II and Anne.

These links brought him both power and enemies, while Charles became increasingly irritated by his criticism; despite having limited responsibility for the disastrous 1665-to-1667 Second Anglo-Dutch War, he was charged with treason and forced into permanent exile. He lived in continental Europe until his death in 1674; during this period he completed The History of the Rebellion, now regarded as one of the most significant histories of the 1642-to-1646 civil war. First written as a defence of Charles I, it was extensively revised after 1667 and became far more critical and frank, particularly in its assessments of his contemporaries.

Personal details
Edward Hyde was born on 18 February 1609, at Dinton, Wiltshire, sixth of nine children and third son of Henry Hyde (1563–1634) and Mary Langford (1578–1661). His siblings included Anne (1597–?), Elizabeth (1599–?), Lawrence (1600–?), Henry (1601–1627), Mary (1603–?), Sibble (1605–?), Susan (1607–1656) and Nicholas (1610–1611).

His father and two of his uncles were lawyers; although Henry retired after his marriage, Nicholas Hyde became Lord Chief Justice, Lawrence was legal advisor to Anne of Denmark, wife of James I. Educated at Gillingham School, in 1622 Hyde was admitted to Hertford College, Oxford, then known as Magdalen Hall, graduating in 1626. He was originally intended for a career in the Church of England, but the death of his elder brothers left him as his father's heir, and instead, he entered the Middle Temple to study law.

He married twice, first in 1629 to Anne Ayliffe, who died six months later, then to Frances Aylesbury in 1634. They had six children who survived infancy: Henry (1638–1709), Laurence (1642–1711), Edward (1645–1665), James (1650–1681), Anne (1638–1671), and Frances. As mother of two queens, Anne is the best remembered, but both Henry and Laurence had significant political careers, the latter being "an exceptionally able politician".

Career: before 1640

Hyde later admitted he had limited interest in a legal career, and declared that "next the immediate blessing and providence of God Almighty" he "owed all the little he knew and the little good that was in him to the friendships and conversation ... of the most excellent men in their several kinds that lived in that age." These included Ben Jonson, John Selden, Edmund Waller, John Hales and especially Lord Falkland, who became his best friend.

Hyde was one of the most prominent members of the famous Great Tew Circle, a group of intellectuals who gathered at Lord Falkland's country house Great Tew in Oxfordshire.

On 22 November 1633 he was called to the bar and obtained quickly a good position and practice; "you may have great joy of your son Ned" his uncle the Attorney General assured his father. Both his marriages gained him influential friends, and in December 1634 he was made keeper of the writs and rolls of the Court of Common Pleas. His able conduct of the petition of the London merchants against Lord Treasurer Portland earned him the approval of Archbishop William Laud, with whom he developed a friendship, though Laud did not make friends easily and his religious views were very different from Hyde's. Hyde in his History explained that he admired Laud for his integrity and decency and excused his notorious rudeness and bad temper, partly because of Laud's humble origins and partly because Hyde recognised the same weaknesses in himself.

Career: 1640 to 1660

In April 1640, Hyde was elected Member of Parliament for both Shaftesbury and Wootton Bassett in the Short Parliament and chose to sit for Wootton Bassett. In November 1640 he was elected MP for Saltash in the Long Parliament, Hyde was at first a moderate critic of King Charles I, but became more supportive of the king after he began to accept reforming bills from Parliament. Hyde opposed legislation restricting the power of the King to appoint his own advisors, viewing it as unnecessary and an affront to the royal prerogative. He gradually moved over towards the royalist side, championing the Church of England and opposing the execution of the Earl of Strafford, Charles's primary adviser. Following the Grand Remonstrance of 1641, Hyde became an informal adviser to the King. He left London about 20 May 1642 and rejoined the king at York. In February 1643, Hyde was knighted and was officially appointed to the Privy Council; the following month he was made Chancellor of the Exchequer.

Despite his own previous opposition to the King, he found it hard to forgive anyone, even a friend, who fought for Parliament, and he severed many personal friendships as a result. With the possible exception of John Pym, he detested all the Parliamentarian leaders, describing Oliver Cromwell as "a brave bad man" and John Hampden as a hypocrite, while Oliver St. John's "foxes and wolves" speech, in favour of the attainder of Strafford, he considered to be the depth of barbarism. His view of the conflict and of his opponents was undoubtedly coloured by the death of his best friend Lord Falkland at the First Battle of Newbury in September 1643. Hyde mourned his death, which he called "a loss most infamous and execrable to all posterity", to the end of his own life.

In 1644, the Royalist-controlled West Country was created a separate government under the Prince of Wales, with Hyde appointed to his General Council; this was partly intended by his opponents as a way to remove him from access to the king. Hyde found it difficult to control his military commanders, notably George Goring, Lord Goring, who, although a brave and capable cavalry general, often refused to follow orders and whose ill-disciplined troops gained a reputation for looting and drunkenness. He described Goring as a man who would "without hesitation have broken any trust, or performed any act of treachery...Of all his qualifications, dissimulation was his masterpiece; in which he so much excelled, that men were not ordinarily ashamed or out of countenance, in being but twice deceived by him".

After the Royalist defeat, Hyde fled to Jersey in 1646; his opposition to alliances with the Scots meant he was not closely involved with the 1648 Second English Civil War, which resulted in the execution of Charles I in January 1649. Despite their differences, he was horrified by the Execution of Charles I; he later described Charles as a man who had an excellent understanding but was not sufficiently confident of it himself, so that he often changed his opinion for a worse one, and "would follow the advice of a man who did not judge as well as himself".

During this period he began writing The History of the Rebellion, but following defeat in the Third English Civil War in 1651, he resumed his position as advisor to Charles II and was appointed Lord Chancellor on 13 January 1658. He also employed his sister Susanna as a Royalist agent; arrested in 1656, she was held in Lambeth Palace prison, where she died soon afterward. Although other female spies are mentioned in his History, she does not appear.

Career: 1660 to 1667
After the Stuart Restoration in 1660, he returned to England and became even closer to the royal family through the marriage of his daughter Anne to the king's brother James, Duke of York. Contemporaries naturally assumed that Hyde had arranged the royal marriage of his daughter, but modern historians, in general, accept his repeated claims that he had no hand in it, and that indeed it came as an unwelcome shock to him. He is supposed to have told Anne that he would rather see her dead than to so disgrace her family.

There were good reasons for his opposition, since he may have hoped to arrange a marriage for James with a foreign princess, and he was well aware that nobody regarded his daughter as a suitable royal match, a view Clarendon shared. On the personal level, he seems to have disliked James, whose impulsive attempt to repudiate the marriage can hardly have endeared him to his father-in-law. Anne enforced the rules of etiquette governing such marriages with great strictness, and thus caused her parents some social embarrassment: as commoners, they were not permitted to sit down in Anne's presence, or to refer to her as their daughter. As Cardinal Mazarin remarked, the marriage damaged Hyde's reputation as a politician, whether he was responsible for it or not. On 3 November 1660, he was raised to the peerage as Baron Hyde, of Hindon in the County of Wiltshire, and on 20 April the next year, at the coronation, he was created Viscount Cornbury and Earl of Clarendon. He served as Chancellor of the University of Oxford from 1660 to 1667.

As effective chief minister in the early years of the reign, he accepted the need to fulfil most of what had been promised in the Declaration of Breda, which he had partly drafted. In particular, he worked hard to fulfil the promise of mercy to all the King's enemies, except the regicides, and this was largely achieved in the Act of Indemnity and Oblivion. Most other problems he was content to leave to Parliament, and in particular to the restored House of Lords; his speech welcoming the Lords' return shows his ingrained dislike of democracy.

He played a key role in Charles' marriage to Catherine of Braganza, with ultimately harmful consequences to himself. Clarendon liked and admired the Queen, and disapproved of the King's openly maintaining his mistresses. The King, however, resented any interference with his private life. Catherine's failure to bear children also was damaging to Clarendon, given the nearness of his own grandchildren to the throne, although it is most unlikely, as was alleged, that Clarendon had planned deliberately for Charles to marry an infertile bride. He and Catherine remained on friendly terms; one of his last letters thanked her for her kindness to his family.

As Lord Chancellor, it is commonly thought that Clarendon was the author of the "Clarendon Code", designed to preserve the supremacy of the Church of England. In reality, he was not very heavily involved with its drafting and actually disapproved of much of its content. The "Great Tew Circle" of which he had been a leading member prided itself on tolerance and respect for religious differences. The code was thus merely named after him as chief minister.

In 1663, he was one of eight Lords Proprietor given title to a huge tract of land in North America which became the Province of Carolina. Shortly after this, an attempt was made to impeach him by George Digby, 2nd Earl of Bristol, a longstanding political opponent from the Civil War. He was accused of arranging for Charles to marry a woman he knew to be barren in order to secure the throne for the children of his daughter Anne, while Clarendon House, his palatial new mansion in Piccadilly, was cited as evidence of corruption. He was also blamed for the Sale of Dunkirk, and the cost of supporting the colony of Tangiers, acquired along with Bombay as part of Catherine's dowry. The windows of Clarendon House were broken, and a placard fixed to the house blaming Hyde for "Dunkirk, Tangiers and a barren Queen".

While these allegations were not taken seriously, and ended by damaging Bristol more than Hyde, he became increasingly unpopular with the public and with Charles, whom he subjected to frequent lectures on his shortcomings. His contempt for Charles' mistress Barbara Villiers, Duchess of Cleveland, earned him her enmity, and she worked with the future members of the Cabal Ministry to destroy him.<ref>Antonia Fraser King Charles II Mandarin Edition 1993 p.253</ref>

His authority was weakened by increasing ill-health, in particular attacks of gout and back pain  that became so severe that he was often incapacitated for months on end: Samuel Pepys records that early in 1665 Hyde was forced to lie on a couch during Council meetings. Even neutrals began to see him as a liability, and when attempts to persuade him to retire failed, some spread false reports that he was anxious to step down. These included Sir William Coventry who later admitted to Pepys that he was largely responsible for these reports; he claimed this was because Clarendon's dominance of policy and refusal to consider alternatives made even their discussion impossible. In his memoirs, Clarendon makes clear his bitterness against Coventry for what he regarded as betrayal, which he contrasted with the loyalty shown by  his brother Henry.

Above all, the military setbacks of the Second Anglo-Dutch War of 1665 to 1667, together with the disasters of the Plague of 1665 and the Great Fire of London, led to his downfall, and the successful Dutch raid on the Medway in June 1667 was the final blow to his career. Despite having opposed the war, unlike many of his accusers, he was removed from office; as he left Whitehall, Barbara Villiers shouted abuse at him, to which he replied with simple dignity: "Madam, pray remember that if you live, you will also be old".

At almost the same time he suffered a great personal blow when his wife died after a short illness: in a will drawn up the previous year, he described her as "my dearly beloved wife, who hath accompanied and assisted me in all my distresses". Clarendon was impeached by the House of Commons for blatant violations of Habeas Corpus, for having sent prisoners out of England to places like Jersey and holding them there without benefit of trial. He was forced to flee to France in November 1667. The King made it clear that he would not defend him, which betrayal of his old and loyal servant harmed Charles's reputation. Efforts to pass an Act of Attainder against him failed, but an Act providing for his banishment  was passed in December and received the royal assent. Apart from the Duke of York (Clarendon's son-in-law) and Henry Coventry, few spoke in his defence. Clarendon was accompanied to France by his private chaplain and ally William Levett, later Dean of Bristol.

Exile, death, and legacy

The rest of Clarendon's life was passed in exile. He left Calais for Rouen on 25 December, returning on 21 January 1668, visiting the baths of Bourbon in April, thence to Avignon in June, residing from July 1668 till June 1671 at Montpellier, whence he proceeded to Moulins and to Rouen again in May 1674. His sudden banishment entailed great personal hardships. His health at the time of his flight was much impaired, and on arriving at Calais he fell dangerously ill; and Louis XIV, anxious at this time to gain popularity in England, sent him peremptory and repeated orders to quit France. He suffered severely from gout, and during the greater part of his exile could not walk without the aid of two men. At Évreux, on 23 April 1668, he was the victim of a murderous assault by English sailors, who attributed to him the non-payment of their wages, and who were on the point of despatching him when he was rescued by the guard. For some time he was not allowed to see any of his children; even correspondence with him was rendered treasonable by the Act of Banishment; and it was not apparently until 1671, 1673, and 1674 that he received visits from his sons, the younger, Lawrence Hyde, being present with him at his death.

He spent his exile updating and expanding his History, the classic account of the Wars of the Three Kingdoms, and for which he is chiefly remembered today. The sale proceeds from this book were instrumental in building the Clarendon Building and Clarendon Fund at Oxford University Press.

The diarist Samuel Pepys wrote thirty years later that he never knew anyone who could speak as well as Hyde.

He died in Rouen, France, on 9 December 1674. Shortly after his death, his body was returned to England, and he was buried in a private ceremony in Westminster Abbey on 4 January 1675.

Portrayals in drama and fiction

Nigel Bruce played Sir Edward Hyde in the 1947 film The Exile, with Douglas Fairbanks, Jr. as Charles II.

In the film Cromwell, Clarendon (called only Sir Edward Hyde in the film), is portrayed by Nigel Stock as a sympathetic, conflicted man torn between Parliament and the king. He finally turns against Charles I altogether when the king pretends to accept Cromwell's terms of peace but secretly and treacherously plots to raise a Catholic army against Parliament and start a second civil war. Clarendon reluctantly, but bravely, gives testimony at the king's trial (where in real life he was not present) which is instrumental in condemning him to death.

In the 2003 BBC TV mini-series Charles II: The Power and The Passion, Clarendon was played by actor Ian McDiarmid. The series portrayed Clarendon (referred to as 'Sir Edward Hyde' throughout) as acting in a paternalistic fashion towards Charles II, something the king comes to dislike. It is also intimated that he had arranged the marriage of Charles and Catherine of Braganza already knowing that she was infertile so that his granddaughters through his daughter Anne Hyde (who had married the future James II) would eventually inherit the throne of England.

In the 2004 film Stage Beauty, starring Billy Crudup and Claire Danes, Clarendon (again referred to simply as Edward Hyde) is played by Edward Fox.

In fiction, Clarendon is a minor character in An Instance of the Fingerpost by Iain Pears and in Act of Oblivion (2022) by Robert Harris. He is also a recurring character in the Thomas Chaloner series of mystery novels by Susanna Gregory. All three authors show him in a fairly sympathetic light.

BibliographyThe history of Rebellion and Civil War in Ireland (1720)A Collection of several tracts of Edward, Earl of Clarendon, (1727)Religion and Policy, and the Countenance and Assistance each should give to the other, with a Survey of the Power and Jurisdiction of the Pope in the dominion of other Princes (Oxford 1811, 2 volumes)
 History of the Rebellion and Civil Wars in England: Begun in the Year 1641 by Edward Hyde, 1st Earl of Clarendon (3 volumes) (1702–1704):
Volume I, Part 1,
Volume I, Part 2, new edition, 1807.
Volume II, Part 1,
Volume II, Part 2,
Volume III, Part 1,
Volume III, Part 2
 Essays, Moral and Entertaining by Clarendon (J. Sharpe, 1819)The Life of Edward Earl of Clarendon, Lord High Chancellor of England, and Chancellor of the University of Oxford Containing:I Life of Edward Earl of Clarendon: An Account of the Chancellor's Life from his Birth to the Restoration in 1660 II Life of Edward Earl of Clarendon: A Continuation of the same, and of his History of the Grand Rebellion, from the Restoration to his Banishment in 1667See also
Historiography of the United Kingdom

References

Sources
 
 
  Contains a list of Clarendon's works.
 
 
 
 
 
 
 
 
 
 
 

Attribution

Bibliography
 Brownley, Martine Watson. Clarendon & the Rhetoric of Historical Form (1985) 
 Craik, Henry. The life of Edward, earl of Clarendon, lord high chancellor of England. (2 vol., 1911) online, vol. 1 to 1660, and vol. 2 from 1660
 Eustace, Timothy. "Edward Hyde, Earl of Clarendon," in Timothy Eustace, ed., Statesmen and Politicians of the Stuart Age (London, 1985), pp. 157–178.
 Finlayson, Michael G. "Clarendon, Providence, and the Historical Revolution", Albion (1990), 22#4, pp. 607–632 in JSTOR
 Firth, Charles H. "Clarendon's 'History of the Rebellion,"' Parts 1, II, III, English Historical Review vol 19, nos. 73–75 (1904)
 Harris, R.W. Clarendon and the English Revolution (London, 1983).
 Hill, Christopher. "Clarendon and the Civil War", History Today (1953), 3#10, pp. 695–703 
 Hill, Christopher.  "Lord Clarendon and the Puritan Revolution", in Hill, Puritanism and Revolution (London, 1958)
 
 Major, Philip, ed. Clarendon Reconsidered: Law, Loyalty, Literature, 1640–1674 (2017), topical essays by scholars
 Miller, G.E. Edward Hyde, Earl of Clarendon (Boston, 1983), as historical writer
 Richardson, R.C. The Debate on the English Revolution Revisited (London, 1988) 
 Trevor-Roper, Hugh. "Edward Hyde, Earl of Clarendon" in Trevor-Roper, From Counter-Reformation to Glorious Revolution (1992) pp. 173–94 online
  Wormald, B.H.G. Clarendon, Politics, History & Religion, 1640–1660 (1951) online
  Wormald, B.H.G. "How Hyde Became a Royalist", Cambridge Historical Journal 8#2 (1945), pp. 65–92 in JSTOR

External links

 
 
 
 
 
 
 Essays by Edward Hyde at Quotidiana.org
 Volume 2 of The Life of Edward Earl of Clarendon by Henry Craik from Project Gutenberg
 The Life of Edward, Earl of Clarendon, in which is included a Continuation of his History of the Grand Rebellion'' by Edward Hyde, 1st Earl of Clarendon (Clarendon Press, 1827): Volume I, Volume II, Volume III
 Historical Enquiries Respecting the Character of Edward Hyde, Earl of Clarendon by George Agar-Ellis (1827)
 

 

|-

|-

1609 births
1674 deaths
17th-century English nobility
17th-century English writers
17th-century English male writers
17th-century English historians
Chancellors of the Exchequer of England
Chancellors of the University of Oxford
1
English essayists
Literary peers
Alumni of Magdalen Hall, Oxford
Lord chancellors of England
Lord High Stewards
Lord-Lieutenants of Oxfordshire
Lord-Lieutenants of Wiltshire
Lords Proprietors of Carolina
Hyde, Edward
Hyde, Edward
Edward Hyde, 1st Earl of Clarendon
Fellows of the Royal Society
People educated at Gillingham Grammar School, Dorset
Burials at Westminster Abbey
English MPs 1640 (April)
English MPs 1640–1648
Impeached British officials
Knights Bachelor
Members of the Privy Council of England
Court of Charles I of England